The Spirit of '43 is an American animated World War II propaganda film created by Walt Disney Studios and released in January 1943. The film stars Donald Duck and features writer/designer Carl Barks' prototype for the character Scrooge McDuck. It's a sequel to The New Spirit. The purpose of the film is to encourage patriotic Americans to file and pay their income taxes faithfully in order to help the war effort. The repeated theme in the film is "Taxes... To Defeat the Axis."

The film is in the public domain and therefore can be seen on many gray market videos as well as official Disney releases.

The title is an allusion to the expression "Spirit of '76" (referring to the sentiment around the American Revolution in 1776).

Plot
In the film, Donald Duck is portrayed as an everyman who has just received his weekly pay. He is met by two physical manifestations of his personality — the classic "good angel on one shoulder, bad devil on the other shoulder" dilemma common to cartoons of the time — identified as the "thrifty saver" and the "spendthrift."

The "good duck" appears as a slightly elderly duck with a Scottish accent who wears a kilt and Scottish cap and urges Donald to be thrifty with his money so he can be sure to pay his taxes for the war effort.  The "bad duck" appears as a zoot suit-wearing hipster who urges Donald to spend his duly earned money on idle pleasures such as "good dates". The good angel reminds of other "dates": the dates when his taxes are due.  The narrator explains that Americans should "gladly and proudly" pay their income taxes which are higher that year "thanks to Hitler and Hirohito."

A tug-of-war ensues between "spend" and "save" with Donald caught in the middle. Eventually the two sides give way and crash on opposite ends of Donald to reveal the "true" selves: the doors of the bad duck's club are revealed to be swastikas and the bad duck himself turns out to bear a resemblance to Hitler (his bow tie is now a swastika and he has grown Hitler's characteristic mustache), while the wall the good duck has crashed up against resembles the flag of the United States. The narrator then asks the audience if they are going to "spend for the Axis" or "save for taxes". Having made the seemingly obvious choice, Donald is assumed to  shake hands with the bad duck, but it is revealed that he heads over to the bad duck to punch him out at the last second.  He then goes to proudly pay his taxes with the good duck.

The second part of the film is a montage entirely recycled from The New Spirit, showing how the taxes are being used to make planes, bombs, ships, and other war materials. It then shows them being used against Axis forces, along with the repeated slogan "Taxes... to (bury, sink, etc.) the Axis", accompanied by the opening bars of Beethoven's Fifth Symphony (the "V for Victory" theme).

Voice cast
 Clarence Nash as Donald Duck

Home media
The short was released on May 18, 2004 on Walt Disney Treasures: Walt Disney on the Front Lines.

References

External links
 The Spirit of '43 on publicdomainmovie.net
 
 
 

1940s English-language films
1943 animated films
1943 short films
1940s Disney animated short films
Donald Duck short films
American World War II propaganda shorts
Films directed by Jack King
Films produced by Walt Disney
Films set on the home front during World War II
World War II films made in wartime
Animated films about birds
American animated short films
Films about ducks
RKO Pictures short films
RKO Pictures animated short films
Films about old age